Azhikode State assembly constituency is one of the 140 state legislative assembly constituencies in Kerala state in southern India. It is also one of the 7 state legislative assembly constituencies included in the Kannur Lok Sabha constituency.
 As of the 2021 assembly elections, the current MLA is K. V. Sumesh of CPI(M).

Local self governed segments
Azhikode Niyama Sabha constituency is composed of the following 15 wards of the Kannur Municipal Corporation (Pallikunnu zone and Puzhathi zone) in Kannur Taluk, and 5 Gram Panchayats in the same Taluk:

Members of Legislative Assembly
The following list contains all members of Kerala legislative assembly who have represented Azhikode Niyama Sabha Constituency during the period of various assemblies:

Key

Election results
Percentage change (±%) denotes the change in the number of votes from the immediate previous election.

Niyamasabha Election 2021 
There were 181,562 registered voters in Azhikode constituency for 2021 Kerala Legislative Assembly election.

Niyama Sabha Election 2016
There were 1,72,757 registered voters in Azhikode Constituency for the 2016 Kerala Niyama Sabha Election.

Niyama Sabha Election 2011

There were 1,47,782 registered voters in Azhikode Constituency for the 2011 Kerala Niyama Sabha Election.

See also
 Azhikode
 Kannur district
 List of constituencies of the Kerala Legislative Assembly
 2016 Kerala Legislative Assembly election

References 

Assembly constituencies of Kerala

State assembly constituencies in Kannur district